Roger Whitney Shattuck (August 20, 1923 in Manhattan, New York – December 8, 2005 in Lincoln, Vermont) was an American writer best known for his books on French literature, art, and music of the twentieth century.

Background and education
Born in New York City to parents Howard Francis Shattuck, a physician, and Elizabeth (Colt) Shattuck, he studied at  St. Paul's School in Concord, New Hampshire before entering Yale College.

Military service in Second World War
He left Yale to join the Army Air Corps, serving as a cargo pilot in the Pacific theater during the Second World War.  He spoke little about his experience in the war, but tried writing about it his entire life. He tried capturing the moment he flew over Nagasaki with his copilot, seeing the aftermath and rubble on the ground. After the war, he returned to school, graduating from Yale in 1947.  Shattuck then moved to Paris where he worked for UNESCO's film service.  In this capacity he came into contact with luminaries of European culture such as Jean Cocteau, Alice B. Toklas and Georges Braque, and met his future wife Nora White, a dancer with the Ballets Russes.

Academic career
Returned to New York, Shattuck worked in publishing, and later taught at Harvard University, the University of Texas at Austin, the University of Virginia, and Boston University, despite his lack of a graduate degree. He retired as a professor emeritus from Boston University in 1997.

Organizations
Shattuck was among the founding members of the Association of Literary Scholars and Critics. He later served as president of the organization.

Works
Shattuck's essays frequently appeared in The New York Review of Books and other publications. He was the author of several highly regarded works of literary criticism—Proust's Way, The Banquet Years: The Origins of the Avant-Garde in France - 1885 to World War I, Forbidden Knowledge: From Prometheus to Pornography—and served as editor of the restored edition of Helen Keller's memoir The Story of My Life.

In 1975, Shattuck received the National Book Award in category Arts and Letters for Marcel Proust (a split award).

Academic philosophy
Routinely described as "one of America's leading literary scholars," Shattuck was considered something of a traditionalist.  He became well known for his 1994 speech "Nineteen Theses on Literature," delivered to the Association of Literary Scholars and Critics.  In it he argued (as point XIV), "Everything has been said. But nobody listens. Therefore it has to be said all over again—only better. In order to say it better, we have to know how it was said before."

Jacques Derrida's 'Declarations of Independence', an early turn to address questions in legal and political philosophy, was written at Shattuck's suggestion on the bicentenary. It was first given as a lecture at the University of Virginia in Charlottesville in 1976 (Derrida, Negotiations, 46).

Upon Shattuck's death, the Yale critic Harold Bloom said of his colleague, "He was an old-fashioned, in a good sense, man of letters. He incarnated his love for literature."

Bibliography
The Banquet Years: The Origins of the Avant-Garde in France, 1885 to World War I (1958)
Proust's Binoculars (1963)
Half Tame (1964)
Proust (Fontana Modern Masters, 1974)
Marcel Proust (1975) [won National Book Award Arts & Letters prize in 1975]
The Forbidden Experiment: The Story of the Wild Boy of Aveyron (1980)
The Innocent Eye: On Modern Literature & the Arts (1984)Forbidden Knowledge: From Prometheus to Pornography (1994)Candor and Perversion: Literature, Education, and the Arts (1998)Proust's Way: A Field Guide to 'In Search of Lost Time''' (2000)

References

External links
Boston Globe obituary
"New York Times Obituary

American essayists
American literary critics
Literary critics of French
2005 deaths
1923 births
Yale University alumni
Harvard University faculty
University of Texas at Austin faculty
University of Virginia faculty
Boston University faculty
National Book Award winners
20th-century essayists